Montserrado-10 is an electoral district for the elections to the House of Representatives of Liberia. The district covers all of the communities of the Congo Town township, except Pagos Island and Swankamore.

Elected representatives

References

Electoral districts in Liberia